In the Light is an album by American jazz drummer Max Roach recorded in 1982 for the Italian Soul Note label.

Reception
The Allmusic review by Ron Wynn awarded the album 4 stars, stating: "This is one of a series of excellent recordings by the Roach 4tet in the early '80s that should be examined as not only excellent works, but perhaps even trend setters for a more progressive concept".

Track listing
All compositions by Max Roach except as indicated
 "In the Light" - 8:40 
 "Straight, No Chaser" (Thelonious Monk) - 7:00 
 "Ruby, My Dear" (Monk) - 4:53 
 "Henry Street Blues" - 4:48 
 "If You Could See Me Now" (Tadd Dameron, Carl Sigman) - 4:27 
 "Good Bait" (Count Basie, Dameron) - 7:38 
 "Tricotism" (Oscar Pettiford) - 4:20
Recorded at Barigozzi Studio in Milano, Italy on July 22 & 23, 1982

Personnel
Max Roach - drums
Cecil Bridgewater - trumpet, flugelhorn (tracks 1–4, 6 & 7)
Odean Pope - tenor saxophone
Calvin Hill - bass

References

Black Saint/Soul Note albums
Max Roach albums
1982 albums